Blye Pagon Faust (born December 28, 1975) is an academy and Emmy Award-winning film producer for the production company Story Force Entertainment.

Her credits include Spotlight, which was awarded Best Motion Picture and Best Original Screenplay at the 2016 Academy Awards and went on to gross nearly $100 million at the worldwide box office during its release. She most recently produced the hit Amazon docuseries LuLaRich. Other documentary credits include Emmy Award-winning and Peabody nominee Belly of the Beast and Emmy and Critic's Choice Award nominee Rewind. In addition to her work as a producer, she is a ReFrame Rise sponsor and is a member of the Advisory Committee for the Mill Valley Film Festival's Mind the Gap: Women|Film|Tech initiative and the Creative Future Leadership Committee. Her board memberships have included The Center for Investigative Reporting, and she is a member of the Producers Guild of America and the State Bar of California.

Faust was raised in Monroe, Washington and attended college at Santa Clara University in Santa Clara, California before moving to Los Angeles to study Entertainment Law at the UCLA School of Law. After getting her J.D. degree there, she worked for O’Melveny & Meyers LLP in Los Angeles.

Faust began working on the film Spotlight with partner Nicole Rocklin in 2007, and in the fall of 2009, she joined with Rocklin to form Rocklin/Faust. In 2016, she won an Academy Award for Best Picture in the 88th Academy Awards for her work on Spotlight. She was also nominated for the BAFTA Award for Best Film for Spotlight in the 69th British Academy Film Awards. Additionally, Faust and the film were nominated for three Golden Globe Awards (including Best Motion Picture - Drama) and won five Independent Spirit Awards.

In 2019, it was announced that Faust would join with producer Cori Shepherd Stern to form Story Force Entertainment (formerly Based On Media).

References

1975 births
American film production company founders
American women film producers
Living people
Producers who won the Best Picture Academy Award
Santa Clara University alumni
UCLA School of Law alumni
People from Monroe, Washington
American television producers
American women television producers
Film producers from Washington (state)
21st-century American women